Born In Minneapolis, Jeff Johnson ("Free" to some of his colleagues) left at age 20, spending time in Philadelphia and New York, and has worked with jazz musicians including Philly Joe Jones, Charlie Rouse, Barney Kessel, Chet Baker, Lew Tabackin, Eddie Daniels, Joanne Brackeen, Julian Priester, Billy Hart, George Cables, Bud Shank, Claudio Roditti, and Michael Wolfe.  Vocalists who have been accompanied by Johnson include Jay Clayton, Ernestine Anderson, Karrin Allyson, Mark Murphy, Rebecca Parris, Annie Ross and Marlena Shaw.

Johnson’s prominent collaborators include pianists Jessica Williams, beginning in Seattle in 1991, and Hal Galper, after they met at the Port Townsend Jazz Festival in 1993.

He now leads various small ensembles, composes, and travels frequently for performance projects and recording dates around the world.

Discography

As leader
Harbinger (1984)
My Heart (1992)
Area 51 (1992)
Lost Men (1993)
Maybeck Duets (1998) with Hal Galper
Free (1999)
The Art of Falling (2001)
Scenes (2001) with Scenes
Winter: An Origin Records Holiday Collection (2002) with Hans Teuber, Dave Peterson and John Bishop (Drummer)
Near Earth (2004)
Along the Way (2006) with Scenes
Furious Rubato (2007) with Hal Galper and John Bishop (drummer)
Tall Stranger (2008)
Suitcase (2011) on Origin Records with Hans Teuber (Saxophones, Bass Clarinet, Alto Flute), Steve Moore (Piano), Eric Eagle (Drums)

As sideman
A Gift (1988) Art Resnick
A Glance Back (1992) Richard Cole (saxophonist)
Walk Spirit, Talk Spirit (1992) John Bishop
Momentum (1994) Jessica Williams
A Song That I Heard (1994) Jessica Williams
Live at Vartan Jazz (1994) Hal Galper Trio
In the Pocket (1994) Jessica Williams
Inventions (1995) Jessica Williams
Rebop (1995) Hal Galper Trio plus Jerry Bergonzi
Joy (1996) Jessica Williams
Fugue State (1997) Hal Galper Trio
Choked Up (1997) Sharpshooters
Now...Here...This (1997) Mike Denny
Mothers Day in Albuquerque (1998) Bert Wilson
Sweet Beat Blues (1998) Hal Galper
Jessica's Blues (1998) Jessica Williams
Forever (1998) Jan Stentz Group
Wish (1998) Kendra Shank
In a Mellow Tone (1999) Ben Black
Suddenly It's Bruno (1999) Jack Brownlow
Here and Now (1999) Steve Korn
Let's Call This That (1999) Hal Galper
Latina by Proxy (2000) Wenda Zonnefeld
Remembered Faces/Private Places (2001) Ben Black
The Wizard (2001) Aaron Parks
Out of Seattle (2002) Dave Peck
House of Jade (2004) Bill Macdonough Quartet
Parallel Tracks (2004) Randy Halberstadt
Individuation (2004) Thomas Marriott
Nothing if Not Something (2004) John Bishop
Good Road (2005) Dave Peck
Both Side of the Fence (2006) Thomas Marriott
More to The Ear than Meets the Eye (2006) Bill Anschell
Shopping For Your Heart (2007) Jeff Baker
Black Hills (2007) Tad Britton
Shade (2008) Richard Cole
One More Mile (2008) Brent Jensen et al.
Harry's Fight (2008) Katie King
Flexicon (2009) Thomas Marriott
Apothecary (2009) on Origin Records with Jon Alberts (piano) and Tad Britton (Drums)
E Pluribus Unum: Live in Seattle (2010) with Hal Galper
Airegin Revisited (2012) on Origin Records with Hal Galper (piano) and John Bishop (drums)

Awards
 2001 Earshot Jazz Instrumentalist of the Year
 2002 Northwest Recording of the Year, The Art of Falling
 2011 Inducted into the Seattle Jazz Hall of Fame

External links
[ Allmusic]
Official Site
Origin Records
Earshot Jazz
Arts Journal
Seattle Jazz Scene

References
 Jeff Johnson
 Origin Records
 Earshot Jazz "Jeff Johnson: Open to the Moment" (June 2012, Vol. 28, No. 06)
 The Arts Journal - Rifftides - "Jeff Johnson and the Contessa" by Doug Ramsey (June 15, 2006)

1954 births
Living people
American jazz double-bassists
Male double-bassists
21st-century double-bassists
21st-century American male musicians
American male jazz musicians